Seclusion is shutting out, or keeping apart, from company, society, the world etc.

Seclusion may also refer to:
Solitude
Seclusion (Penumbra album), 2003
Seclusion (Aereogramme album), 2004
Warm seclusion, the mature phase of an extratropical cyclone
Seclusion policy, the former foreign relations policy of Japan whereby nobody could enter or leave the country